The evolutionary origins of yellow fever most likely came from Africa.
Phylogenetic analyses indicate that the virus originated from East or Central Africa, with transmission between primates and humans, and spread from there to West Africa. The virus as well as the vector Aedes aegypti, a mosquito species, were probably brought to the western hemisphere and the Americas by slave trade ships from Africa after the first European exploration in 1492. However, some researchers have argued that yellow fever might have existed in the Americas during the pre-Columbian period as mosquitoes of the genus Haemagogus, which is indigenous to the Americas, have been known to carry the disease.

The first outbreaks of disease that were probably yellow fever occurred in the Windward Islands of the Caribbean, on Barbados in 1647 and Guadeloupe in 1648. Barbados had undergone an ecological transformation with the introduction of sugar cultivation by the Dutch. Plentiful forests present in the 1640s were completely gone by the 1660s. By the early 18th century, the same transformation related to sugar cultivation had occurred on the larger islands of Jamaica, Hispaniola and Cuba. Spanish colonists recorded an outbreak in 1648 on the Yucatán Peninsula of Mexico that may have been yellow fever. The illness was called xekik (black vomit) by the Maya.

At least 25 major outbreaks followed in North America, such as in 1793 in Philadelphia, where several thousand people died, more than nine percent of the total population. The American government, including George Washington, had to flee the city, which was the capital of the United States at the time. In 1878, about 20,000 people died in an epidemic which struck the towns of the Mississippi River Valley and its tributaries. The last major outbreak in the US occurred in 1905 in New Orleans. Major outbreaks also occurred in Europe in the 19th century in Atlantic ports following the arrival of sailing vessels from the Caribbean, most often from Havana. Outbreaks occurred in Barcelona, Spain, in 1803, 1821, and 1870. In the 1870 outbreak, 1,235 fatalities were recorded of an estimated 12,000 cases.  Smaller outbreaks occurred in Saint-Nazaire in France, Swansea in Wales, and in other European port cities, following the arrival of vessels carrying the mosquito vector.

The first mention of the disease by the name "yellow fever" occurred in 1744. Many famous people, mostly during the 18th through the 20th centuries, contracted and then recovered from, or died of, yellow fever.

Philadelphia 1793-1805 

The Yellow Fever Epidemic of 1793 struck during the summer in Philadelphia, Pennsylvania, where the highest fatalities in the United States were recorded. The disease probably was brought by refugees and mosquitoes on ships from Saint-Domingue. It rapidly spread in the port city, in the crowded blocks along the Delaware River. About 5000 people died, ten percent of the population of 50,000. The city was then the national capital, and the national government left the city, including President George Washington. Philadelphia, Baltimore and New York suffered repeated epidemics in the 18th and 19th centuries, as did other cities along the East and Gulf coasts.

At the time, the known solution to recovery was found to be long and tedious as it was expected that patients needed to consume bitters and country air away from the metropolitan area, in order to recover. Yet the average citizen typically sought medical help from the Pennsylvania Hospital. Year after year starting in 1793, yellow fever returned to major cities along the east coast including Philadelphia leaving investigators stagnant in regard to progress made in the search for the cause of yellow fever. Yellow Fever's prevalence during this era killed over 10,000 people starting in 1793 where nearly 5,000 people died, striking again in 1797 tallying about 1,500 people, and again the next year in 1798 killing 3,645 people.

Potential Causes 
With the spread of yellow fever in 1793, physicians of the time used the increase number of patients to increase the knowledge in disease as the spread of yellow fever, helping differentiate between other prevalent diseases during the time period as cholera, and typhus were current epidemics of the time as well. As doctors and people of interest investigated the cause of yellow fever, two main hypotheses derived from the confusing data they collected. The first being the disease is contagious, as the disease is spread through the contact of people, as ships from the already infected Caribbean Islands had spread to major cities. The second hypothesis being that the disease derived from local sources proposing that contact with them caused the sickness rather than the spreading be with people as yellow fever seemed to be prevalent in major cities and less effective in rural areas.

Haiti: 1790–1802
The majority of the British soldiers sent to Haiti in the 1790s died of disease, chiefly yellow fever.  There has been considerable debate over whether the number of deaths caused by disease was exaggerated.

In 1802–1803, an army of forty thousand sent by First Consul Napoleon Bonaparte of France to Saint Domingue to suppress the Haitian Revolution mounted by slaves, was decimated by an epidemic of yellow fever (among the casualties was the expedition's commander and Bonaparte's brother-in-law, Charles Leclerc). Some historians believe Napoleon intended to use the island as a staging point for an invasion of the United States through Louisiana (then newly regained by the French from the Spanish.). Others believe that he was most intent on regaining control of the lucrative sugar production and trade in Saint-Domingue. Only one-third of the French troops survived to return to France, and in 1804 the new republic of Haiti declared its independence.

Savannah, Georgia: 1820
Nearly 700 people in Savannah, Georgia, died from yellow fever in 1820, including two local physicians who lost their lives caring for the stricken. An outbreak on an immigrant ship with Irish natives in 1819 led to a passage of an act to prevent the arrival of immigrant ships, which did not prevent the epidemic where 23% of the deaths were of Irish descent. Several other epidemics followed, including 1854 and 1876.

New Orleans, Louisiana: 1853
The 1853 outbreak claimed 7,849 residents of New Orleans.  The press and the medical profession did not alert citizens of the outbreak until the middle of July, after more than one thousand people had already died.  The New Orleans business community feared that word of an epidemic would cause a quarantine to be placed on the city, and their trade would suffer. In such epidemics, steamboats frequently carried passengers and the disease upriver from New Orleans to other cities along the Mississippi River.

The epidemic was dramatized and featured in the plot of the 1938 film Jezebel, starring Bette Davis.

Yellow fever was a threat in New Orleans and south Louisiana virtually every year, during the warmest months. Among the more prominent victims were: Spanish colonial Governor Manuel Gayoso de Lemos (1799); the first and second wives (d. 1804 and 1809) and young daughter (1804) of territorial Governor William C. C. Claiborne; one of New Orleans' most important early city planners Barthelemy Lafon (1820), architect Benjamin Henry Latrobe and one of his sons (1820, 1817, respectively), who were in New Orleans building the city's first waterworks; Jesse Burton Harrison (1841), a young lawyer and author;  Confederate Brig. Gen. Young Marshall Moody (1866); architect James Gallier, Jr. (1868); and Confederate Lt. Gen. John Bell Hood and his wife and daughter (1879).

Norfolk, Virginia: 1855

A ship carrying persons infected with the virus arrived in Hampton Roads in southeastern Virginia in June 1855. The disease spread quickly through the community, eventually killing over 3,000 people, mostly residents of Norfolk and Portsmouth. The Howard Association, a benevolent organization, was formed to help coordinate assistance in the form of funds, supplies, and medical professionals and volunteers, who poured in from many other areas, particularly the Atlantic and Gulf Coast areas of the United States.

Bermuda: 1843, 1853. 1856, 1864

Bermuda suffered four yellow fever epidemics in the 1800s, both mosquito borne and via visiting ships, and in total claimed the lives of 13,356 people, including Military and civilian population. During the 1864 epidemic, a Dr. Luke Pryor Blackburn, from Halifax, Nova Scotia, visited the island several times, to assist the local medical community on account of his knowledge of the disease, and when he left in October 1864, he left behind some trunks of soiled clothing that were to have been sent to him in Canada. Fortunately the trunks were located and the contents destroyed.

It became evident that Dr Blackburn's visits had been financed by the Confederacy, and that a certain Union informer had been offered $60,000 to distribute Dr. Blackburn's trunks of soiled clothing to Union cities including Boston, Philadelphia, Washington and Norfolk. Also one trunk went to New Bern, which was identified as having brought yellow fever to that city, claiming the lives of 2,000 people.

Blackburn was arrested and tried, but acquitted owing to lack of evidence, other than hearsay by witnesses, meaning that the culprit trunks could not be located, and in 1878, he went on heroically, to fight yellow fever in Kentucky where he had set up practice in Louisville, and was eventually elected governor of that state.

Texas and Louisiana: 1867
The 1867 yellow fever epidemic claimed many casualties in the southern counties of Texas, as well as in New Orleans. The deaths in Texas included Union Maj. Gen. Charles Griffin, Margaret Lea Houston (Mrs. Sam Houston), and at least two young physicians and their family members.

Lower Mississippi Valley: 1878

In 1878, a severe yellow fever epidemic swept through the lower Mississippi Valley.

The French Panama Canal Effort: 1882–1889
The French effort to build a Panama Canal was damaged by the prevalence of endemic tropical diseases in the Isthmus.  Although malaria was also a serious problem for the French canal builders, the numerous yellow fever fatalities and the fear they engendered made it difficult for the French company to retain sufficient technical staff to sustain the effort.  Since the mode of transmission of the disease was unknown, the French response to the disease was limited to care of the sick. The French hospitals contained many pools of stagnant water, such as basins underneath potted plants, in which mosquitoes could breed. The numerous deaths eventually led to the failure of the French company licensed to build the canal, resulting in a massive financial crisis in France.

References

External links
"'Bronze John': Yellow fever epidemics in New Orleans" at The Times-Picayune; updated 27 September 2013, accessed 31 October 2015.
Great Yellow Fever Epidemic of 1820 historical marker in Savannah, Georgia

Yellow fever
Yellow fever